Bellone was a 44-gun Consolante-class frigate of the French Navy.

French service 

Bellone, under the command of Guy-Victor Duperré, departed Saint-Malo on 18 January 1809, bound for the Indian Ocean. She sailed from La Réunion for a combat patrol in August. On 2 November she captured HMS Victor. Twenty days later, she captured the 48-gun Portuguese Minerva after a 2-hour battle. Bellone sailed back to La Réunion with her prize, arriving on 2 January 1810.

In April 1810, the squadron comprising Bellone, Minerve and Victor departed for another patrol, during which they fought the action of 3 July 1810 and the Battle of Grand Port.

Bellone was surrendered to the British when Île de France fell, on 4 December 1810.

British service
Bellone was recommissioned in the Royal Navy as HMS Junon.

In June 1812, Junon escorted a convoy from Portsmouth to India.

On 8 February 1813, nine boats and 200 men of the squadron of which Junon was part captured the letter of marque schooner Lottery. Lottery was of 210 tons burthen (bm), copper-bottomed and fastened, and carried six 12-pounder carronades, though she was pierced for 16 cannon. Her crew put up a strong defense with the result that the British cutting out party suffered six men wounded, half severely or dangerously, one of whom died later; Junon herself suffered two men wounded. The Americans suffered 19 men wounded, including their captain, John Southcomb, before they struck. Southcomb died of his wounds and his body was taken ashore. Lottery had been carrying a cargo of coffee, sugar and lumber from Baltimore to Bordeaux. A week later Lottery convoyed several prizes to Bermuda.

In June, Bellones boats raided the James River, and she sustained attack by US gunboats.

She had been sailing from Boston to Amelia Island in ballast. The Vice admiralty court in Halifax restored her to her owners.

Citations

References
 Fonds Marine. Campagnes (opérations ; divisions et stations navales ; missions diverses). Inventaire de la sous-série Marine BB4. Tome deuxième : BB4 1 à 482 (1790-1826) 
 
 
 
 
 

Age of Sail frigates of France
Ships built in France
1807 ships
Consolante-class frigates
Frigates of the French Navy
Captured ships
War of 1812 ships of the United Kingdom
Frigates of the Royal Navy